Shine's whipsnake (Demansia shinei) also known commonly as Shine's Australian whipsnake, is a species of venomous snake in the family Elapidae. The species is endemic to Australia.

Etymology
The specific name, shinei, is in honour of Australian herpetologist Richard "Rick" Shine.

Geographic range
D. shinei is found in Northern Territory and Western Australia, Australia.

Habitat
The preferred natural habitats of D. shinei are desert, rocky areas, grassland, shrubland, and savanna.

Description
Dorsally, it is pale grey-brown. Ventrally, it is lemon yellow. The top of the head is brown, followed by a narrow yellow crossband on the nape, followed by a wider brown crossband.

Reproduction
D. shinei is oviparous.

References

Further reading
Cogger HG (2014). Reptiles and Amphibians of Australia, Seventh Edition. Clayton, Victoria, Australia: CSIRO Publishing. xxx + 1,033 pp. .
Shea GM, Scanlon JD (2007). "Revision of the Small Tropical Whipsnakes Previously Referred to Demansia olivacea (Gray, 1842) and Demansia torquata (Günther, 1862) (Squamata: Elapidae)". Records of the Australian Museum 59: 117–142. ("Demansia shinei Shea", new species, pp. 135–136, Figures 18–19).
Wilson S, Swan G (2013). A Complete Guide to Reptiles of Australia, Fourth Edition. Sydney: New Holland Publishers. 522 pp. .

Demansia
Snakes of Australia
Reptiles described in 2007
Reptiles of the Northern Territory
Reptiles of Western Australia